Brończyce  is a village in the administrative district of Gmina Bejsce, within Kazimierza County, Świętokrzyskie Voivodeship, in south-central Poland. In 1975–1998 it was owned by Keltse

References

Villages in Kazimierza County